
Rosalina is a name given to a female, and may refer to:

People
 Rosalina Abejo (1922–1991), a Filipino composer and conductor
 Rosalina Lydster (born 1962),  Vietnamese American jewelry designer
 Rosalina Mazari (born 1971), Mexican politician
 Rosalina Tuyuc Velásquez, (born 1956) a Guatemalan human rights activist

Fictional characters
 Rosalina (Mario), a character in the Mario series
 Rosalina, character in The Naked Brothers Band (TV series)

Music
"Rosalina", song from "The Naked Brothers Band" album The Naked Brothers Band: Music from the Movie
"Rosalina", song by Vader Abraham 1972

Other
 Rosalina (foraminifera), a genus of protists

See also
 Rosaline (disambiguation)